Theobald Wolfe Tone, posthumously known as Wolfe Tone (20 June 176319 November 1798), was a leading Irish revolutionary figure and one of the founding members in Belfast and Dublin of the United Irishmen, a republican society determined to end British rule, and achieve accountable government, in Ireland. Throughout his political career, Tone was involved in a number of military engagements against the British navy. He was active in drawing Irish Catholics and Protestants together in the United cause, and in soliciting French assistance for a general insurrection. In November 1798, on his second attempt to land in Ireland with French troops and supplies, he was captured by British naval forces. The United Irish risings of the summer had already been crushed. Tone died in advance of his scheduled execution, probably, as modern scholars generally believe, by his own hand.

Later generations were to regard Tone as the father of Irish Republicanism. His grave in Bodenstown, County Kildare, is the site of annual commemorations.

Early life
Wolfe Tone was born on 20 June 1763. His father’s family descended from a French Protestant family who fled to England from Gascony in the 16th century to escape religious persecution. A branch of the family settled in Dublin in the 17th century. Theobald's father, Peter Tone, was a coach-maker who had a farm near Sallins, County Kildare and belonged to the Church of Ireland. His mother came from a Catholic merchant family who converted to Protestantism after Theobald was born. His maternal grandfather was captain of a vessel in the West India trade. 
 
He was baptised as Theobald Wolfe Tone in honour of his godfather, Theobald Wolfe of Blackhall, County Kildare, a first cousin of Arthur Wolfe, 1st Viscount Kilwarden. However, it was widely believed that Tone was the son of Theobald Wolfe, which, if true, made him a half-brother of the poet Charles Wolfe. After his death, he was widely referred to as Wolfe Tone.

In 1783, Tone found work as a tutor to Anthony and Robert, younger half-brothers of Richard Martin MP of Galway, a prominent supporter of Catholic emancipation, at Dangan, the Martin family home. Tone fell in love with Martin's wife, but later wrote that it came to nothing. During this period he briefly considered a career in the theatre as an actor.

He studied law at Trinity College Dublin, where he became an active member in the College Historical Society debating club and was elected its auditor in 1785. He was made a scholar in 1784 and graduated BA in February 1786. He qualified as a barrister in King's Inns at the age of 26 after keeping the requisite terms as a student member of the Middle Temple in London.

As a student, he eloped with Martha Witherington, daughter of William and Catherine Witherington (née Fanning) of Dublin. She would go on to change her name to Matilda, at Tone's request.
When they married, Tone was 22, and Matilda was about 16. In 1796, while he was in France and she in Hamburg he wrote in his journal: "She is the delight of my eyes, the joy of my heart, the only object for which I wish to live. I doat upon her to distraction."

Disappointed at finding no support for a plan that he had submitted to William Pitt the Younger, to found a military colony in Hawaii, Tone initially planned to enlist as a soldier in the East India Company, but applied too late in the year, when no more ships would be sent out until the following spring.

Politician

In September 1791, Tone published An Argument on behalf of the Catholics of Ireland, signed "A Northern Whig". It displayed the growing breach between Whig patriots like Henry Flood and Henry Grattan, who sought Catholic emancipation and parliamentary reform without severing the tie to England. Tone expressed contempt for the constitution Grattan obtained from the British government in 1782. Himself an Anglican, Tone urged co-operation between the religions in Ireland as the only means of obtaining redress of Irish grievances. The British government had just passed the Roman Catholic Relief Act 1791, but the Dublin parliament was in no hurry to do so.

Sharing Tone's frustration with Protestant Patriotism, William Drennan proposed to his largely Presbyterian friends in Belfast, "a benevolent conspiracy--a plot for the people" dedicated to "The Rights of Man" and to "Real Independence" for Ireland. Attending their first meeting in Belfast in October 1791, with Cork man Thomas Russell, Tone re-iterated the thrust of his Argument on behalf of the Catholics of Ireland:. the "imaginary Revolution of 1782" had failed to secure a representative and national government for Ireland because Protestants had refused to make common cause with Catholics. Ireland would continue to be governed in the exclusive interests of England and of the landed Ascendancy, so long as Irish Protestants remained "illiberal", "bigoted" and "blind". 

Calling themselves, at Tone's suggestion, the Society of the United Irishmen, the meeting resolved upon an "equal representation of all the people" in parliament. Employing, as Drennan had proposed "much of the secrecy and somewhat of the ceremonial of Free-Masonry", the Society spread rapidly across the Presbyterian districts of the north, to Dublin and, in alliance with the Catholic Defenders, across the Irish midlands. 

Aiming at no more than the formation of a union between Catholics and Protestants to press for parliamentary reform, Tone's membership of the Society was not deemed incompatible, in 1792, to his appointment as assistant secretary of the Catholic Committee.

The Catholics involved on the committee in Dublin were not united regarding the steps they were to take, and in December 1791, sixty-eight members withdrew, led by Lord Kenmare, with the support of the higher clergy. When the British government questioned the legality of the Catholic Convention called in December 1792, Tone drew up for the committee a statement of the case on which a favourable opinion of counsel was obtained. In January 1793 Tone found "every reason to be content" with an audience he and other members of the Catholic Committee had had with the King, George III, in London. In April Dublin Castle put its weight behind Grattan in the passage of a Catholic Relief Act. Catholics were admitted to the franchise (but not yet to Parliament or to Crown offices) on the same limited property terms as Protestants. They could again be called as barristers and serve as army officers. They could not, however, enter parliament or be made state officials above grand jurors. The Convention voted to Tone a sum of £1,500 with a gold medal and voted to dissolve. In this new climate of goodwill the Maynooth College Act 1795 was passed.

Sectarian animosity threatened to undermine the United Irishmen movement: two secret societies in Ulster fought against each other: the agrarian Protestant Peep o' Day Boys and their Catholic opponents the Defenders. Tone's aim was to unite both into a revolutionary army of Irish "men of no property". Tone himself admitted that with him hatred of England had always been "rather an instinct than a principle," though until his views should become more generally accepted in Ireland he was prepared to work for reform as distinguished from revolution. But he desired to root out the popular respect for the names of Charlemont and Grattan, and to transfer to more violent leaders the conduct of the national movement. Wolfe Tone's principles were drawn from the French Convention, and he was a disciple of Georges Danton and Thomas Paine.

Revolutionary in exile

In 1794 the Society of United Irishmen became a sworn association, using oaths that aimed at the overthrow of the Kingdom of Ireland. Given that France and Britain had been at war since early 1793, administering or making such oaths turned a reformist republican society that had wanted to extend the franchise within the existing system into a republican revolutionary one.

Affiliating more closely with the new French Republic also associated Tone with its evolving policy of "Dechristianization", which was strongly opposed by the Catholic Church in Ireland. Although he was seen as a Catholic champion in the early 1790s, most of his wealthier Catholic supporters fell away in 1794.

Also in 1794, the United Irishmen, persuaded that no party in the Dublin parliament (where being an MP was limited to Anglicans) seemed likely to accept their scheme of universal manhood suffrage and equal electoral districts, began to recast their hopes on a French invasion. An Irish clergyman living in England, the Reverend William Jackson, who had taken in revolutionary opinions during his long stay in France, came to Ireland to ascertain to what extent the Irish people were ready to support a French invasion. Tone drew up a memorandum for Jackson on the state of Ireland, which he described as ripe for revolution. An attorney named Cockayne, to whom Jackson had imprudently disclosed his mission, betrayed the memorandum to the government. In April 1794 Jackson was arrested on a charge of treason and dramatically committed suicide during his trial.

Several of the leading United Irishmen, including Archibald Hamilton Rowan, fled the country; the papers of the United Irishmen were seized by the Dublin administration, and for a time the organisation was broken up. Tone, who had not attended meetings of the society since May 1793, remained in Ireland until after the trial of Jackson and was advised to leave Ireland in April 1795. Having friends among the government party, including members of the Beresford family, he succeeded in making terms with the government and emigrated to the United States, where he arrived in May 1795. Before leaving, he and his family travelled to Belfast, and it was at the summit of Cavehill that Tone made the Cavehill Compact with fellow Irish radicals, including Russell and McCracken, promising "never to desist in our efforts until we had subverted the authority of England over our country, and asserted our independence."

The United Irishmen reformed in 1796. The Society began seriously to look to France to support a rising with troops.

Living in Philadelphia, Tone wrote a few months later to Thomas Russell expressing unqualified dislike of the American people, whom he imagined to be no more truly democratic in sentiment and no less attached to authority than the British; he described George Washington as a "high-flying aristocrat", and he found the aristocracy of money and achievement in America still less to his liking than the European aristocracy of birth. Tone also lived briefly in West Chester and in Downingtown, Pennsylvania.

Finding himself at Philadelphia in the company of Reynolds, Rowan, and Tandy, Tone went to Paris to persuade the French government to send an expedition to invade Ireland. In February 1796 he arrived in Paris and had interviews with De La Croix and Carnot, who were impressed by his energy, sincerity, and ability. A commission was given him as adjutant-general in the French army, which he hoped might protect him from the penalty of treason in the event of capture by the British; though he himself claimed the authorship of a proclamation said to have been issued by the United Irishmen, enjoining that all Irishmen taken with arms in their hands in the British service should be instantly shot; and he supported a project for landing La Legion Noire in England, who were to burn Bristol.

A sympathizer wrote of him, in French,  saying:
Wolfe Tone was sent to France to claim the support of the Directory, under the express condition that the French should come to Ireland as allies, and should act under direction of the new government, as Rochambeau had done in America.  With this view, Tone had frequently conferences at Paris with Hoche; and the Directory finally determined to send from Brest a fleet of forty-five sail, with an army of fifteen thousand men, under the charge of this able general, December 15, 1796.  England was saved by a violent tempest.

Hoche's Expedition and the 1798 Rebellion

The French Directory planned a military landing in Ireland in support of the coming revolution foretold by Tone. The Directory possessed information from Lord Edward FitzGerald and Arthur O'Connor confirming Tone, and prepared to despatch an expedition under Louis Lazare Hoche. On 15 December 1796, the expedition, consisting of forty-three sail and carrying about 14,450 men with a large supply of war material for distribution in Ireland, sailed from Brest. Tone accompanied it as "Adjutant-general Smith" and had the greatest contempt for the seamanship of the French sailors, who were unable to land due to severe gales. They waited for days off Bantry Bay, waiting for the winds to ease, but eventually returned to France.

Tone served for some months in the French army under Hoche, who had become the French Republic's minister of war after his victory against the Austrians at the Battle of Neuwied on the Rhine in April 1797. In June 1797 Tone took part in preparations for a military expedition to Ireland from the Batavian Republic, a puppet state created during the Batavian Revolution in the Low Countries in January 1795. However, the Batavian fleet under Dutch Vice-Admiral Jan de Winter was delayed in the harbour of Texel island that summer by unfavourable easterly winds and from mid-August by a British North-Sea fleet blockade. It eventually put to sea in the first week of October only to be immediately crushed by Admiral Adam Duncan in the Battle of Camperdown on October 11, 1797. Tone then returned to Paris. General Hoche, once tasked with an Irish expeditionary force, died of tuberculosis on 19 September 1797 at Wetzlar after returning to his command on France's Rhine frontier.

In Ireland the membership of the United Irish had reached 300,000, about 6% of the population, but a vicious counter-insurgency campaign in 1797 weakened the organisation and forced the leadership to launch a rising without French aid. More importantly, in a largely devoutly Catholic country, the Roman Catholic hierarchy was completely opposed to the United Irish, as they were allied to the French who had just invaded Rome and set up the anti-clerical "Roman Republic" in early 1798.

Napoleon Bonaparte, with whom Tone had several interviews at this time, was less disposed than Hoche had been to undertake in earnest an Irish expedition; and when the Rising broke out in Ireland in 1798 he had started for Egypt. When Tone urged the Directory to send effective assistance to the Irish rebels, all that could be promised was a number of raids to descend simultaneously around the Irish coast. One of these under General Jean Humbert succeeded in landing a force near Killala, County Mayo, and gained some success in Connacht (particularly at Castlebar) before it was subdued by General Lake and Charles Cornwallis. Wolfe Tone's brother Matthew was captured, tried by court-martial, and hanged; a second raid, accompanied by Napper Tandy, came to disaster on the coast of Donegal; while Wolfe Tone took part in a third, under Admiral Jean-Baptiste-François Bompart, with General Jean Hardy in command of a force of about 3,000 men. This encountered a British squadron at Buncrana on Lough Swilly on 12 October 1798. Tone, on board the ship Hoche, refused Bompart's offer of escape in a frigate before the battle of Tory Island, and was taken prisoner when the Hoche surrendered. Tone was brought ashore at Letterkenny Port and all French forces of the Hoche were taken to Lord Cavan's Letterkenny home where he faced arrest.

On revolutionary purpose and violence
Summarising his purpose, Tone declared:To subvert the tyranny of our execrable government, to break the connection with England (the never failing source of our political evils) and to assert the independence of my country--these were my objects. To unite the whole people of Ireland: to abolish the memory of all past dissentions; and to substitute the common name of Irishmen in place of the denomination of Protestant, Catholic and Dissenter--these were my means.

Yet he conceded that he "despaired" of Protestants (i.e. the Anglican Ascendancy) "for obvious reasons": they were already in possession of the whole power and patronage of the country. Appearing to "write off own class completely" in conversations with General Henri Clarke (a second generation Irishman who later was to serve Napoleon as Minister of War) he apprehended a general massacre of the gentry and a redistribution of their entire property. The violence he would seek to restrain. On this score Hoche cautioned him not to be complacent. Tone records in his Memoirs:Hoche mentioned, also, that great mischief had been done to the principles of liberty and additional difficulties thrown in the way of the French Revolution, by the quantity of blood spilled: "for", he added, "if you guillotine a man, you get rid of an individual, it is true, but then you make all his friends and connections enemies for ever of the government".Tone expressed himself "heartily glad to find Hoche of this humane temperament" and trusted "we shall be able to avoid unnecessary bloodshed in Ireland."

Death

When the prisoners were landed a fortnight later, Sir George Hill recognised Tone in the French adjutant-general's uniform in Lord Cavan's privy-quarters at Letterkenny. At his trial by court-martial in Dublin on 8 November 1798 Tone made a speech avowing his determined hostility to England and his intention "by frank and open war to procure the separation of the countries".
Recognising that the court was certain to convict him, he asked that "the court should adjudge me to die the death of a soldier, and that I may be shot". Reading from a prepared speech, he defended his view of a military separation from Britain (as had occurred in the fledgeling United States) and explained his motives:

A commentary on the trial continues: "After a long silence, interrupted by some expressions of admiration, he was told that his request should be submitted to the Lord-lieutenant.  Thinking, however, that there was but little prospect, he committed suicide in prison.  With Wolfe Tone, terminated the insurrection of 1798. He was the prime mover of it, and was its last victim…"

He also lamented the outbreak of mass violence, saying: "Such are my principles such has been my conduct; if in consequence of the measures in which I have been engaged misfortunes have been brought upon this country, I heartily lament it, but let it be remembered that it is now nearly four years since I have quit Ireland and consequently I have been personally concerned in none of them; if I am rightly informed very great atrocities have been committed on both sides, but that does not at all diminish my regret; for a fair and open war I was prepared; if that has degenerated into a system of assassination, massacre, and plunder I do again most sincerely lament it, and those few who know me personally will give me I am sure credit for the assertion."

To the people, he had the following to say from the dock:

His eloquence was in vain, and his request to be shot was denied. On 10 November 1798, he was found guilty and sentenced to be hanged on 12 November. Before this sentence was carried out, he was mortally wounded as a result either of being tortured by British soldiers or, as is today more generally accepted, of attempting to slit his own throat. The story goes that he was initially saved when the wound was sealed with a bandage, and he was told if he tried to talk the wound would open and he would bleed to death. He responded by saying "I can yet find words to thank you sir; it is the most welcome news you could give me. What should I wish to live for?".

Military surgeon Benjamin Lentaigne treated Tone just hours before he was due to be hanged. A pamphlet published in Latin by the doctor some years after Tone's official "suicide" refers to an unusual neck wound suffered by an unnamed patient which indicated that "a bullet passed through his throat". This has led to speculation that Tone may have been shot.

Theobald Wolfe Tone died on 19 November 1798 at the age of 35 in Provost's Prison, Dublin, not far from where he was born. He is buried in Bodenstown, Co. Kildare, near his birthplace at Sallins, and his grave is in the care of the National Graves Association.

Support from Lord Kilwarden

His godfather Theobald Wolfe was Tone's natural father, according to several sources. A cousin, Arthur Wolfe, Lord Kilwarden, had warned Tone to leave Ireland in 1795. Then when Tone was arrested and brought to Dublin in 1798, and facing certain execution, it was Kilwarden (a senior judge) who granted two orders for Habeas Corpus for his release. This was a remarkable act, given that the rebellion had just occurred with great loss of life, and one that could never be enlarged upon as Kilwarden was killed at the beginning of Emmet's revolt in 1803. The Wolfes knew that Tone was their cousin. As a pillar of the Protestant Ascendancy and, as Attorney-General for Ireland the prosecutor of the case against United Irishman William Orr, Kilwarden had no other obvious motive for trying to assist Tone in 1795 and 1798. Portraits of Wolfe around 1800 arguably show a resemblance to Wolfe Tone.

Maud Wolfe (1892–1980), the last of the Wolfes to live in Kildare, continued her family tradition of annually laying flowers at Tone's grave until her death.

The historian A. T. Q. Stewart has commented (2001) on Tone's long obsession with the heroism and death in battle of James Wolfe in 1759, seeing him as a cousin to be emulated. In this sense "Wolfe Tone" becomes a surname reflecting his true paternity.

Legacy

"[Tone] rises", said William Lecky, the 19th-century historian, "far above the dreary level of commonplace which Irish conspiracy in general presents… His judgement of men and things was keen, lucid and masculine, and he was alike prompt in decision and brave in action."

His journals, which were written for his family and intimate friends were published in Washington DC in 1821 by his son, William Theobald Wolfe Tone. They were republished in 1910 by Richard Barry O'Brien.

Tone was adopted by the Young Ireland movement of the 1840s as an iconic figure, as the father of Irish republicanism and above religious divisions. Its leader Thomas Davis found and publicised the location of Tone's grave in 1843. Modern republicans quote his ideals:

In 1898 a series of centenary commemorations of the 1798 rebellion were held by the nationalist Irish Parliamentary Party, the Irish Republican Brotherhood and the Catholic Church in Ireland, that to a large extent sidelined Tone and the other Protestant Nationalist leaders. This "Faith and Fatherland" approach mythologised Tone and recast the rebellion as Church-sanctioned, the exact opposite of its policy in 1798.

Every summer, Irish Republicans hold commemorations at Tone's grave in Bodenstown. In 1912 an annual commemoration march from Naas to Bodenstown was started by Tom Clarke, who was to be executed after the 1916 Rising. The march became a part of the folklore of Irish republican groups, with a new headstone placed in the 1940s.

An attempt on 17 June 1934 by Protestant Republican Congress members from Belfast to join in the commemoration march was prevented by IRA stewards. The marchers were stoned and "scuffles broke out". This was portrayed by some commentators as sectarianism, that republicans had abandoned Tone's aim to unite Irishmen by ignoring their religious differences, paying tribute only to his anti-British republicanism. However, Brian Hanley's history of the IRA from 1926 to 1936 concludes that the trouble arose because they were seen as "communist", and not for sectarian reasons.

From the 1960s the Wolfe Tone Societies were founded, but failed to have an impact on mainstream Irish politics. Some members were also affiliated with the IRA. As a result, Tone's grave was bombed at night by the Ulster Volunteer Force in 1971, and was then rebuilt.

Descendants
Of Tone's four children, three died prematurely. His eldest child, Maria Tone (1786–1803; died in Paris) and his youngest child, Francis Rawdon Tone (1793–1806) both died of tuberculosis. Another son, Richard Tone (born between 1787 and 1789) died in infancy.

Only his son William Theobald Wolfe Tone survived to adulthood. Raised in France by his mother after Tone's death, William was appointed a cadet in the Imperial School of Cavalry in 1810 on Napoleon's orders. He was a naturalised French citizen on 4 May 1812. In January 1813 he was made sub-lieutenant in the 8th Regiment of Chasseurs and joined the Grand Army in Germany. His nom de guerre was the punning le petit loup – the little wolf. He was at the battles of Löwenberg, Goldberg, Dresden, Bauthen, Mühlberg, Aachen, and Leipzig. He received six lance wounds at the Battle of Leipzig, was promoted to lieutenant and aide-de-camp of General Bagneres and was decorated with the Legion of Honour.

After the defeat of Napoleon at the Battle of Waterloo, he emigrated to the United States, where he was commissioned a Captain in the United States Army and died there on 11 October 1828 at the age of 37. Matilda Tone also emigrated to the United States, and is buried in Greenwood Cemetery in Brooklyn, New York. William Tone was survived by his only child, his daughter Grace Georgina.

In popular culture

Several Gaelic Athletic Association clubs in Ireland are named in honour of Wolfe Tone. These include, in Armagh, Wolfe Tone GAC, Derrymacash; in Derry, Bellaghy Wolfe Tones GAC; in Meath, Wolfe Tones GAA, and in Tyrone, Drumquin Wolfe Tones GAC and Kildress Wolfe Tones GAC. In North America, there is the Chicago Wolfe Tones GFC in Illinois, and the Edmonton Wolfe Tones in Alberta, Canada. In Antrim, the Greencastle Wolfe Tones GAC is based in the Greencastle district of North Belfast, bordering Cavehill where members of the United Irishmen took their oaths.

In 1963, Brian Warfield, Noel Nagle, Tommy Byrne, and Derek Warfield formed The Wolfe Tones, an Irish rebel music band. They play Irish rebel music and are strong supporters of Irish reunification. Several streets, plazas and a bridge have been named in honour of Tone, including Wolfe Tone Square in Dublin and Wolfe Tone Bridge over the River Corrib in Galway city.

A documentary by Kenneth Griffith on the life of Wolfe Tone was completed but not released. It was offered to the BBC but due to the film being mired with political controversy they did not take up this option.

Notes

References
 
Seán Ua Ceallaigh (ed.), Speeches from the Dock, or Protests of Irish Patriotism (Dublin: M. H. Gill and Son, 1953).
 Herr, Cheryl. For the Land They Loved: Irish Political Melodramas, 1890–1925. Syracuse University Press, 1991.

Further reading
Stephen McGarry, Irish Brigades Abroad (Dublin, 2013) (softback).
T.W. Moody, R.B. McDowell and C.J. Woods (eds.), The Writings of Theobald Wolfe Tone 1763–98, Volume I: Tone's Career in Ireland to June 1795 (Oxford: Oxford University Press, 1998).
T.W. Moody, R.B. McDowell and C.J. Woods (eds.), The Writings of Theobald Wolfe Tone 1763–98, Volume II: America, France, and Bantry Bay, August 1795 to December 1796 (Oxford: Oxford University Press, 2001).
T.W. Moody, R.B. McDowell and C.J. Woods (eds.), The Writings of Theobald Wolfe Tone 1763–98, Volume III: France, the Rhine, Lough Swilly and Death of Tone, January 1797 to November 1798 (Oxford: Oxford University Press, 2007).
 Life of Theobald Wolfe Tone by himself, continued by his son, with his political writings, edited by W.T. Wolfe Tone (2 volumes, Washington, 1826).
 Thomas Bartlett, (ed.), Life of Theobald Wolfe Tone Memoirs, Journals and political writings, compiled and arranged by William T.W. Tone, 1826 (Dublin, 1998) [softback].
 Autobiography of Theobald Wolfe Tone, edited with introduction by R. Barry O'Brien (2 vols., London, 1893);
 Lives of the United Irishmen by R.R. Madden, (7 vols., London, 1842);
 History of Ireland in the Eighteenth Century, by W. E. H. Lecky, vols. iii., iv., v. (cabinet ed., 5 vols., London, 1892).
 "Wolfe Tone's Provost Prison", by Patrick Denis O'Donnell, in The Irish Sword, no. 42, Volume XI, Military History Society of Ireland, Dublin, 1973.
 "Wolfe Tone: Suicide or Assassination", by Patrick Denis O'Donnell, in Irish Journal of Medical Science, no. 57, Dublin, 1997 (with T. Gorey)
 "By fair and open war to procure the separation of the two countries," Footsteps in Time by Kevin McCarthy, published by CJ Fallon.
 Chapter 13 "Theobald Wolfe Tone and County Kildare" by C.J. Woods; in Kildare History and Society (Geography Press, Dublin 2006) pp. 387–398. ed. by Nolan, W. & McGrath, T.
 Elliott, Marianne (1989). Wolfe Tone: Prophet of Irish Independence. New Haven, CT: Yale University Press.
 Elliott, Marianne (2012), Wolfe Tone, 2nd edition, Chicago: University of Chicago Press.
 IrishKevinSmith.com
 Cork-guide.ie
 Chaptersofdoublin.com Memoirs by Jonah Barrington (1828)
 
 The Year of the French by Thomas Flanagan
 "A Rough Guide to Revolutionary Paris: Wolfe Tone as an accidental tourist", by Sylvie Kleinman, in History Ireland 16:2 (2008) 34–39.http://www.historyireland.com/volumes/volume16/issue2/features/?id=114441
 "Un brave de plus: la carrière militaire de Theobald Wolfe Tone, héros du nationalisme irlandais et officier francais, 1796–1798" by Sylvie Kleinman, in Revue Historique des Armées France-Irlande n°253/2008, 55–65.  http://rha.revues.org/index4602.html.
"Ambassador incognito and Accidental Tourist: Cultural Perspectives on Theobald Wolfe Tone's Mission to France, 1796-8", by Sylvie Kleinman, in Michael Brown and Rosalyn Trigger (eds), Journal of Irish and Scottish Studies, 'The Auld Alliance: Irish & Scottish Connections with France since 1500', Volume 2: Issue 1, September 2008 (University of Aberdeen), pp101–122.
https://web.archive.org/web/20121207153604/http://www.abdn.ac.uk/riiss/JISS/2.1/2.1_Kleinman.pdf
 "Un brave de plus: Theobald Wolfe Tone, alias Adjudant-general James Smith, French officer and Irish patriot adventurer, 1796-8", by Sylvie Kleinman, in Nathalie Genêt-Rouffiac & David Murphy (eds.), Franco-Irish Military connections, 1590–1945. Proceedings of the Vincennes Conference (Sept. 2007), Dublin: Four Courts, 2009, pp163–188.
"Tone and the French Expeditions to Ireland, 1796-1798: Total War, or Liberation?", by Sylvie Kleinman, in Pierre Serna, Antonino De Francesco & Judith Miller (eds.), Republics at War, 1776-1840 Revolutions, Conflicts, and Geopolitics in Europe and the Atlantic World (Basingstoke, 2013). 83-103.

External links

 Laragy, Georgina. "Wolfe Tone and the culture of suicide in eighteenth-century Ireland", History Ireland, Vol.21, Issue 6 (November/December 2013)
 Bartlett, Thomas. "Theobald Wolfe Tone: An Eighteenth-Century Republican and Separatist"

1763 births
1798 deaths

Alumni of Trinity College Dublin
Auditors of the College Historical Society
Irish Anglicans
Irish people of French descent
Irish people who died in prison custody
Irish politicians who committed suicide
Irish prisoners sentenced to death
Members of the King's Inns
Politicians from Dublin (city)
People who committed suicide in prison custody
Prisoners sentenced to death by the British military
Prisoners who died in British military detention
Protestant Irish nationalists
Scholars of Trinity College Dublin
Suicides by sharp instrument in Ireland
United Irishmen
Alumni of King's Inns
18th-century suicides